Renate Wilson (born Renate Fischer, 20 April 1930 - 7 December 2008) was a social and medical historian and former German film actress.

Acting career 
She appeared in seven films from 1949 to 1957.

Filmography

Career in history 
In the 1960s, Wilson moved to the United States. She was a Fulbright fellow at Johns Hopkins University and went on to obtain a PhD in history from the University of Maryland in 1988. She became known for her work on the influence of German emigrants on medicine and pharmacy in the United States.

Death and legacy 
Wilson died on 7 December 2008.

References

External links 

1930 births
2008 deaths
Actresses from Berlin
German film actresses